Darryl Gerrod Hardy (born November 22, 1968) is a former American football linebacker in the National Football League (NFL) for the Arizona Cardinals, Dallas Cowboys and Seattle Seahawks. He played college football at the University of Tennessee.

Early years
Hardy attended Princeton High School, where he played center on the offensive line as a freshman. The next year, he was moved to offensive tackle. As a senior, he was an All-state offensive guard (weighing 185 pounds). In his final game, he got the opportunity to start at outside linebacker, posting 15 tackles and 4.5 sacks.

He accepted a football scholarship from the University of Tennessee to play linebacker. He became a starter at outside linebacker as a sophomore and registered 20 tackles (fourth in school history) against the University of Alabama.

He finished his college career with 318 total tackles, 227 solo tackles (ninth in school history), 20 tackles for loss, 4 interceptions, 5 fumble recoveries, 5 forced fumbles and 5 blocked kicks.

Professional career

Atlanta Falcons
Hardy was selected by the Atlanta Falcons in the tenth round (270th overall) of the 1992 NFL Draft. On August 31, he was waived and signed to the practice squad. He was released on August 23, 1993.

Ottawa Rough Riders (CFL)
On April 7, 1994, he was signed by the Ottawa Rough Riders of the Canadian Football League. He was cut on July 4.

Dallas Cowboys (first stint)
In July 1994, he signed as a free agent with the Dallas Cowboys. He was released on August 3.

Arizona Cardinals
On August 27, 1994, he was waived and signed to the practice squad. He was promoted to the active roster on December 20 and was declared inactive for the last game of the season.

He was waived On October 2, 1995. He appeared in 5 games, tallying one defensive tackle and 2 special teams tackles.

Dallas Cowboys (second stint)
On October 3, 1995, he was claimed off waivers by the Dallas Cowboys to improve the special teams units. He was a part of the team that won Super Bowl XXX, although he was deactivated for the game. He was cut on August 20, 1996.

In 1996, he injured his left knee in a preseason game against the Los Angeles Raiders. He had arthroscopic surgery on August 2. He was cut on August 20.

He was signed in 1997 and appeared in 12 games. He was released in December.

Seattle Seahawks
On December 10, 1997, he was claimed off waivers by the Seattle Seahawks. He played on special teams in the final two games of the season. The next year, he failed to report to minicamp and told the Seahawks he was not sure if he wanted to continue playing football. He was released on June 10, 1998.

References

External links
Just Sports Stats
Chance on defense propelled Hardy

Living people
1968 births
People from Sharonville, Ohio
Players of American football from Ohio
American football linebackers
African-American players of American football
Tennessee Volunteers football players
Arizona Cardinals players
Dallas Cowboys players
Seattle Seahawks players
21st-century African-American people
20th-century African-American sportspeople